https://dharampuralahore.wordpress.com

Dharampura ), alternatively spelt Dharmapura, is a neighbourhood located in Lahore. The Mughal emperor Akbar laid the foundation of this colony for Hindus as an alms-house in 1583. After 1947 Partition it was renamed Mustafabad but is still locally known as Dharampura.

Dharampura sits on the western bank of the Lahore Canal, between the Walled City of Lahore and the Lahore Cantonment. It is a largely working class neighbourhood. The area was largely populated by Hindus and Sikhs prior to the Partition of British India.  The locality is also the ancestral home of Sushma Swaraj, who was a lawyer in Supreme Court of India and the Minister of External Affairs of India.

Baba Sain Mir Mohammed Sahib, popularly known as Mian Mir or Miyan Mir, was a famous Sufi Muslim saint who resided in Lahore, specifically in the town of Dharampura (in present-day Pakistan).

Mustafa Abad Bazar is more popularly Bazar as know Dharampura Bazar is the main Bazar in Lahore, Punjab. Pakistan.  It is a famous food bazaar in Lahore like Gawalmandi. It is also well known for groceries and cloth. There are around about 500 shopped

References

Aziz Bhatti Zone